Jessica E. Wooley (born 1968) is small business owner, lawyer and served as an American legislator and a Democratic member of the Hawaii House of Representatives since November 2008, representing District 47 until November 2012; after redistricting in 2012, Wooley represented District 48. Wooley consecutively served from 2009 until 2014, when she was appointed by Governor Neil Abercrombie as the Director for the Office of Environmental Quality Control.

Education
Wooley earned her BA in economics from University of California, Santa Cruz, her MS in Agricultural and Resource Economics from the University of California, Berkeley, and her JD from its UC Berkeley School of Law.

Elections
 Wooley, a lawyer, Democrat and advocate for civil, environmental and economic rights and justice (i.e., green growth and housing, clean water and energy, food security, school gardens, keeping Kahana residents on the land, protecting Native and wild plants and animals, etc.), first ran for office in 2008, beating Maria Pacheco in the Primary and beating long-time incumbent Republican Representative Colleen Meyer for the District 47 seat. Wooley won the September 20, 2008 Democratic Primary with 2,695 votes (67.7%), and won the November 4, 2008 General election with 4,934 votes (50.6%).
 2010 Wooley was unopposed for the September 18, 2010 Democratic Primary, winning with 3,978 votes, and won the November 2, 2010 General election with 4,761 votes (57.4%), beating Republican nominee Richard Fale.
 2012 Redistricting led to Wooley being switched to district 48. She had to run against then State House Majority Leader, Democratic Representative Pono Chong. Wooley won the August 11, 2012 Democratic Primary with 3,846 votes (54.5%) and was unopposed for the November 6, 2012 General election.
 Representative Wooley resigned her seat on May 5, 2014, after her Gubernatorial nomination, approval by the Senate and acceptance of the position as Director of the Office of Environmental Quality Control (OEQC); Director Wooley left OEQC at the end of 2015 and started her own company, `Āina Aloha Consulting, in 2016.

References

External links
 Official page at the Hawaii State Legislature
 Campaign site
 

Date of birth missing (living people)
Living people
Democratic Party members of the Hawaii House of Representatives
Politicians from Scottsdale, Arizona
Politicians from Honolulu
UC Berkeley College of Natural Resources alumni
UC Berkeley School of Law alumni
University of California, Santa Cruz alumni
Women state legislators in Hawaii
1968 births
21st-century American women